Amara musculis is a species of seed-eating ground beetle in the family Carabidae. It is found in North America.

Amara musculis measure .

References

Further reading

 

musculis
Beetles of North America
Beetles described in 1823
Taxa named by Thomas Say
Articles created by Qbugbot